Arcangelo Madrignano (died 1529) was a Roman Catholic prelate who served as Bishop of Avellino e Frigento (1510–1516).).

Biography
On 18 August 1516, Arcangelo Madrignano was appointed during the papacy of Pope Leo X as Bishop of Avellino e Frigento. He served as Bishop of Avellino e Frigento until his resignation on 28 March 1520. He died in 1529.

References

External links and additional sources
 (for Chronology of Bishops) 
 (for Chronology of Bishops) 

16th-century Italian Roman Catholic bishops
Bishops appointed by Pope Leo X
1529 deaths